John Decatur Messick (November 9, 1897 – October 3, 1993) was the fifth president of what is now East Carolina University.  He was born on November 9, 1897, near Aurora, North Carolina.  He graduated from Elon College in 1922.  He then went to summer school to complete graduate work at the University of North Carolina at Chapel Hill.  In 1934, he earned a Ph.D. degree from New York University.

External links 
 Messick biography

Presidents of East Carolina University
1897 births
1993 deaths
People from Beaufort County, North Carolina
20th-century American academics